Lonicera utahensis is a species of flowering plant in the honeysuckle family known by the common names Utah honeysuckle, red twinberry, and fly honeysuckle. It is native to western North America from British Columbia, Washington (state), and Oregon, east to Alberta and Montana and south through the Rocky Mountains to Arizona and New Mexico.

This honeysuckle is a deciduous shrub growing 1 to 2 meters tall. It has slender, spreading branches and it may take a clumpy form. The leaves are oval or oblong in shape and measure up to 8 centimeters long by 4 wide. The undersides are hairless or have stiff hairs. Pairs of flowers are borne on peduncles up to 15 centimeters long. The flowers are yellow or yellowish white in color and are 1 to 2 centimeters long. The fruit is a red berry almost 1 centimeter wide. The seeds are dispersed by animals that eat the fruit, including birds and bears.

This plant occurs in the understory of mature forests, such as those composed of grand fir and Rocky Mountain maple. It is often a climax species. It may be a codominant plant in subalpine fir-common beargrass plant communities. Other associated plants include white spiraea, ninebark, Scouler willow, Sitka alder, thinleaf huckleberry, pinegrass, queencup beadlily, and sweetscented bedstraw.

This plant can be used as an ornamental and in revegetation efforts.

References

External links

The Nature Conservancy

utahensis
Flora of Western Canada
Flora of the Western United States